Rogério da Silva Ramos (born 7 September 1998) is a Portuguese footballer who plays for SC A.D. Ovarense, as a defender.

Football career
On 26 January 2016, Roger made his professional debut with Paços Ferreira in a 2015–16 Taça da Liga match against Portimonense.

References

External links

Stats and profile at LPFP 

1998 births
Living people
Sportspeople from Santa Maria da Feira
Portuguese footballers
Association football defenders
FC Porto players
Padroense F.C. players
F.C. Paços de Ferreira players
C.D. Feirense players
A.D. Ovarense players